Larisa Savchenko and Natasha Zvereva defeated Steffi Graf and Gabriela Sabatini in the final, 6–4, 6–4 to win the women's doubles tennis title at the 1989 French Open. It was Graf and Sabatini's third runner-up finish at the event.

Martina Navratilova and Pam Shriver were the two-time reigning champions, but did not participate this year.

Seeds

Draw

Finals

Top half

Section 1

Section 2

Bottom half

Section 3

Section 4

References
1989 French Open – Women's draws and results at the International Tennis Federation

Women's Doubles
French Open by year – Women's doubles
1989 in women's tennis
1989 in French women's sport